The 1973 CONCACAF Youth Tournament was held in Mexico.

Teams
The following teams entered the tournament:

Group stage

Group 1

Group 2

Semifinals

Third place match

Final

External links
Results by RSSSF

CONCACAF Under-20 Championship
1972–73 in Mexican football
Youth
1973
1973 in youth association football